Geoffrey Gordon (born 28 August 1968) is an American composer of classical music.

Biography 

Gordon's list of works includes orchestral and chamber music—vocal and instrumental—as well as scores for theater, dance and film. His music has been called "darkly seductive" (The New York Times), "brilliant" (Boston Globe), "gripping...energetic expressiveness" (Bachtrack), "fascinating" (Milwaukee Journal), "wonderfully idiomatic" (Salt Lake Tribune), "haunting" (Strings Magazine) and "remarkable" (Fanfare). Chicago Tribune music critic John von Rhein called Gordon's lux solis aeterna, premiered by the acclaimed Fulcrum Point New Music Project, "a cosmic beauty ... of acutely crafted music." And music critic Lawrence Johnson, of Classical Review, called Gordon's work Tiger Psalms, a very impressive and significant world premiere ... the composer makes the music sing magnificently." 

A winner of the Aaron Copland Award, Gordon has twice served as composer-in-residence at the Aaron Copland House (2008–09). His work has been funded by the Barlow Endowment, the National Endowment for the Arts, Arts Council England, the Danish Arts Foundation, the United Performing Arts Fund, the Concert Artists Guild, the American Composers Forum, Meet the Composer, the MacArthur Foundation, the American Music Center, the Abelson Foundation, the Mary Flagler Cary Trust, the Cheswatyr Foundation, the Bush Foundation and New Music USA. He has been in residence at the La Napoule Arts Foundation in Cannes, and at the historic Cliff Dweller Club in Chicago. He has been nominated for the Chamber Music Society of Lincoln Center's Elise Stoeger Prize, and is the recipient of the 2017 Mario Merz Prize in Music Composition. He has received financial and academic support from Boston University and the Guildhall School of Music and Drama. His works have been recorded on the Centaur, Ravello and Signum labels, among others. Many of his published works are available from Theodore Front Musical Literature. The Loeb Music Library at Harvard University, the Bayerische Staatsbibliothek in Munich and the music library of the National University of Singapore hold collections of his works.

Gordon's work has been commissioned by and for many of the finest ensembles in the world, including the Philharmonia Orchestra (London), the Copenhagen Philharmonic, the Malmö Symphony Orchestra, the Minnesota Orchestra, Britten Sinfonia, the Cleveland Orchestra, the Munich Philharmonic, the Dallas Symphony, the English Symphony Orchestra, the Milwaukee Symphony, the Buffalo Philharmonic, Boston Modern Orchestra Project, the Brno Philharmonic Orchestra, the JACK Quartet, Ensemble Meitar, Mogens Dahl Choir, the Parker Quartet, Third Angle Ensemble, Fulcrum Point New Music Project, Ensemble Aleph, Aguavá New Music Studio, Ensemble Zeitfluss, Great Noise Ensemble and the International Contemporary Ensemble. He has served as composer-in-residence at the International Centre for Composers in Visby, Sweden. He received the 2015 commission award from the American Music Project, through which his QUINTET for Clarinet and Strings (for the JACK Quartet and Anthony McGill, principal clarinet of New York Philharmonic) premiered to critical acclaim in New York City and Chicago. The English Symphony Orchestra commissioned Saint Blue, a double concerto for trumpet, piano and strings (funded by the English Arts Council), which premiered at Elgar Concert Hall in Birmingham, England, in May 2015. A studio recording, featuring soloists Simon Desbruslais (trumpet) and Clare Hammond (piano), was released on the Signum Records label in August 2017. In December 2015, cellist Toke Møldrup premiered Gordon's cello sonata, FATHOMS, after Shakespeare's The Tempest, at Carnegie Hall in New York City. (The Copenhagen Philharmonic commissioned Gordon's Concerto for Cello and Orchestra, after Thomas Mann's Doktor Faustus, for Moldrup in 2014.) FATHOMS received its European premiere at St. John's Smith Square in London, in May, 2017. (New York Times music critic Corinna da Fonseca-Wollheim described FATHOMS as "engaging and colorful... extroverted storytelling.") His vocal/chamber work Winterleben, for French horn, mezzo-soprano and piano, commissioned for Los Angeles Philharmonic principal horn, Andrew Bain, was premiered at the Colburn School in August 2015 in Los Angeles, as part of the 47th International Horn Symposium. In October 2017, the Munich Philharmonic gave the world premiere performances of Chase, a concerto for trumpet and orchestra commissioned by the orchestra for their principal trumpet, Guido Segers, inspired by the works of Swiss sculptor Alberto Giacometti.

He has been featured on the cover of M Magazine, and profiled on National Public Radio. His work has been broadcast on WFMT in Chicago and WNYC in New York. Gordon has served as an ASCAP representative in Washington, D.C., lobbying Congress on behalf of copyright protection and composers' rights. He has served as composer-in-residence for the Boston-based Xanthos Ensemble and as a staff composer for the American Composers Orchestra in New York City. Gordon has also served as the music director and an on-air host for classical radio WFMR-FM. He currently divides time between the United States and the United Kingdom.

List of works

Solo 
 Three Summer Sketches 12′ (for solo piano; 2012)
 Bagatelle after Beethoven 3′ (for solo piano; 2012)
 Aria and Cadenza for solo violin 10′ (2001)
 Lorca Music per cello solo 10′ (1998)
 Impromptu for solo piano 7′ (1995)

Chamber 
 QUINTET for Clarinet and Strings 30′ (2015)
 FATHOMS – Five Impressions of The Tempest, with Prelude 32′ (for solo cello and piano; 2015)
 THORN 15′ (for violin, horn, piano; 2014)
 XIX (after Gabrieli) 5′ (for symphonic winds and percussion; 2014)
 Duo Sonata 16′ (for two French horns and piano; 2013)
 Abaciscus (String Quartet No. 2) 18′ (2012)
 Flamingo (Five Views of the Calder Sculpture Chicago) 6′ (for flute, clarinet, cello, piano; 2010)
 Reliquary 25′ (for piano trio; 2010)
 Ink on Paper (String Quartet No. 1) 25′ (2009)
 TRIO (B clarinet, violin, cello) 10′ (2009)
 Echoes of Ferrara (alto recorder, dbl. tenor and soprano, harpsichord) 20′ (2006)
 Bright White Smooth 6′ (for flute, viola, harp; also: flute, cello, one perc., piano; 2005/2006)
 Fancywork 16′ (for violin and guitar; 2005)
 A Canticle in Shards 7′ (for flute, oboe, B clarinet, bassoon, piano; 2005)
 Stanza della Segnatura 18′ (for 2 recorders, viola da gamba, harpsichord; 2004)
 wrecked angels ... 12′ (for flute, guitar, cello; 2003)
 Interiors of a Courtyard 20′ (for mandolin and guitar; 2003)
 Cool RED Cool (after Andy Warhol Self Portrait) 7′ (for flute, alto sax, trumpet, 2 percussion, piano, bass; 2000)
 Sonata da Chroma 16′ (for oboe, B clarinet, one percussion, cello, harpsichord; 2000)
 Lines Written in Early Spring (after Wordsworth, 1789) 9′ (for flute, English horn, piano; also: flute, viola, piano; 2000)

Vocal 
 Peter Quince at the Clavier (after a text by Wallace Stevens) 14′ (for baritone and piano; 2017)
 Winterleben (after a text by Friedrich Rückert) 25′ (for mezzo-soprano, French horn, piano; 2015)
 Sonnets from Neruda (after six texts by Pablo Neruda) 28′ (for mezzo-soprano, baritone, piano; 2014)
 Needles in my flesh .... (after five texts by poet Pia Tafdrup) 12′ (for alto voice and double bass; 2012)
 Tiger Psalms (after texts by Ted Hughes) 16′ (for mezzo-soprano soloist with flute, clarinet, trumpet, viola, double bass, one perc., piano; 2011)
 Fallen Eve (Five Songs after Hughes) 17′ (for mezzo-soprano soloist with flute, clarinet, violin, cello, one perc., piano; 2005)
 la tristesse durera toujours (after texts drawn from the letters of Vincent van Gogh) 23′ (for soprano soloist with clarinet, violin, cello, one percussion, piano; 2003)
 Collage a Trois Trobar 10′ (for five mixed voices with recorders and percussion; 1999)

Choral 
 Ode to a Nightingale (after the text by John Keats) 16′ (for mixed choir SATB and solo cello; 2017)
 Crucifixus (from the Ordinary of the Latin Mass) 12′ (for double choir SATB/SATB and solo cello; 2016)
 The Bird of Dawning Singeth (after a text by Shakespeare/Hamlet) 5′ (for twelve solo voices: SSSAAATTTBBB; 2016)
 Judas mercator pessimus (from the Tenebrae Responsories for Maundy Thursday) 5′ (for six unaccompanied male voices: AATTBrB; 2016)
 Four Preludes (after a text by T. S. Eliot) 8′ (for SATB, string orchestra and piano; 2013)
 Shhhhh 7′ (for mixed choir a cappella; 2005)
 Love Among the Ruins 8′ ((for mixed choir SATB unaccompanied; also: for mixed choir SATB, ten winds, 2 percussion, harp, piano, bass; 2001/2002)
 Agnus Dei 9′ (for SATB and ten instruments: 1997/2005)
 Missa solemnis in fragminis 25′ ((for SATB and Chamber Orchestra; 1997)

Orchestral 
 TWELVE – after the Windows of Jerusalem by Marc Chagall 18′ (for orchestra 2017)
 PUCK – fleeing from the dawn 7′ (for orchestra; 2017)
 Chase – A Concerto for Trumpet and Orchestra 25′ (after the sculptures of artist Alberto Giacometti) (for trumpet and large orchestra; 2017)
 ROCKS 21′ (for symphonic winds, brass, harp, piano, double bass, percussion; 2016)
 Nescientis Animi (after the math of Gottfried Leibniz) 14′ (for orchestra; 2016)
 Saint Blue (after Kandinsky) 10′ (double concerto for trumpet, piano, strings; 2014)
 Where the Wild Things Are (after the story by Maurice Sendak) 21′ (for cello, trombone soloists, large orchestra; 2014)
 Mephisto Waltz No. 3 by Liszt; arr. Geoffrey Gordon 10′ (for orchestra; 2014)
 Concerto for Cello and Orchestra (after Thomas Mann's Doktor Faustus) 24′ (for cello soloist and large orchestra; 2013)
 Concerto for Flute and Orchestra 20′ (for flute soloist and large orchestra; 2012)
 Concerto for Trombone and Orchestra 27′ (for trombone soloist and large orchestra; 2010)
 Meditation and Allegro for Viola and Ensemble 15′ (for viola soloist and chamber orchestra; 2010)
 Shock Diamonds 13′ (for large orchestra; 2008)
 lux solis aeterna 9′ (for chamber orchestra; 2007)
 An Imagined Poussin Triptych 20′ (for string orchestra; 2001)
 Sones Sueño del Maya 11′ (for orchestral winds and percussion; 2001)
 Mis en Scene 8′ (for large orchestra; 1999)
 Concerto in One Movement for Violin and Orchestra 16′ (for violin and orchestra; 1997)

Ballet 
 The House of Bernarda Alba (after the play Federico García Lorca) 54′ (Ballet in three acts for mixed chamber ensemble; also: three concert suites; 1995)

References

External links 
 
 Geoffrey Gordon's page on SoundCloud
 Geoffrey Gordon's page on Theodore Front Musical Literature

American classical composers
Living people
21st-century American composers
20th-century classical composers
Place of birth missing (living people)
21st-century classical composers
American male classical composers
20th-century American composers
1968 births
20th-century American male musicians
21st-century American male musicians